Adil Abdul-Mahdi al-Muntafiki (born 1 January 1942) is an Iraqi politician  who served as Prime Minister of Iraq from October 2018 until May 2020. Abdul-Mahdi is an economist and was one of the vice presidents of Iraq from 2005 to 2011. He formerly served as Minister of Finance in the Interim government and Oil Minister from 2014 to 2016.

Abdul-Mahdi is a former member of the powerful Shi'a party the Supreme Islamic Iraqi Council, or SIIC. Long based in neighboring Iran, the group opposed a United States administration while holding close ties with the other, U.S.-backed, groups that opposed Saddam Hussein, including the Kurds and the Iraqi National Congress.

Abdul-Mahdi submitted his formal resignation as Prime Minister in November 2019, following widespread protests over political corruption and violent police responses.

Background 
Mahdi was born in Baghdad in 1942, the son of a Shiite cleric, Abdul-Mahdi, originally from Dhi Qar Governorate, who was the Minister of Education in Iraq's monarchy. He attended high school at Baghdad College, an elite American Jesuit secondary school. After graduating, he attended Baghdad University, where he earned a Bachelor of Arts degree in economics in 1963. He worked as a secretary for the Iraqi foreign ministry in 1965 and was an early supporter of the Iraqi Ba'ath Party, but left due to ideological disagreements. In 1969, he moved to France where he worked for French think tanks and edited magazines in French and Arabic. In 1972 he obtained another Master of Arts degree in political economy from the University of Poitiers. He later obtained a PhD in economics. Abdul-Mahdi is a French citizen, as are his children, and he returned to Iraq after the overthrow of Saddam Hussein in 2003.

Political career 

In the 1970s, Abdul-Mahdi was a leading member of the Iraqi Communist Party. The party split into two separate factions, the ICP-Central Committee, which was more accommodating of the military governments that had ruled Iraq since 1958, and the ICP-Central Leadership, which rejected all forms of cooperation of what it regarded as anti-progressive regimes, in 1967. Abdul-Mahdi joined the ICP-Central Leadership, and continued being active until it gradually disappeared by the early 1980s. By that time, Abdul-Mahdi adopted Iranian Islamic ideas, eventually merging with the Islamists when Ayatollah Khomeini eradicated the communists and liberal opposition groups in Iran. Abdul-Mahdi continued his association with Iran and gradually amalgamated his group within the ICP-Central Leadership with the Iranians, rejecting his Marxist past and devoting all his group's time to propagating Khomeini's ideas in France, where he lived at the time. He eventually was made a member of the Supreme Council for the Islamic Revolution in Iraq, an exiled opposition party and militia that was formed by Iran in Tehran in 1982 but composed exclusively of Iraqi exiles.

In 2006, Abdul-Mahdi, outgoing Vice President in the transitional government, unsuccessfully ran for the United Iraqi Alliance's nomination for Prime Minister against incumbent Ibrahim al-Jaafari. He lost by one vote. He was reportedly considered to be a possibility for Prime Minister once again until Nouri al-Maliki became the UIA nominee. Subsequently, Abdul-Mahdi was re-elected as Vice President of Iraq. He exerted his limited authority in that role by delaying the first meeting of the National Assembly in March. He resigned from his position as vice-president on 31 May 2011.

In December 2006, the Associated Press reported that Abdul-Mahdi could be the next Prime Minister of Iraq if a new multi-sectarian coalition succeeded in toppling the government of Nouri al-Maliki.

On 26 February 2007, he survived an assassination attempt that killed ten people. He had been targeted two times prior.

In 2009, his bodyguards were the perpetrators of a bloody bank robbery in Baghdad.

In July 2013, Abdul-Mahdi announced his decision to give up his retirement pensions as a former vice president.

On 2 October 2018, Iraqi president Barham Salih selected Abdul-Mahdi to be the Prime Minister of Iraq. Mahdi had 30 days to form a new government. On 25 October 2018, Abdul Mahdi was sworn into office, five months after the 2018 elections.

In April 2019, Abdul-Mahdi met with German Chancellor Angela Merkel in Berlin. He announced a $14 billion plan to upgrade Iraq's electricity infrastructure, with likely cooperation with German company Siemens. Merkel also pledged to strengthen economic and security cooperation between the two countries, and to continue German support for reconstruction efforts in Iraq.

Resignation 
On 29 November 2019, after weeks of violent protests, Mahdi stated that he would resign from his post. The Iraqi parliament approved his resignation on 1 December 2019.

References

External links 

Official Website
 

1942 births
Iraqi Communist Party politicians
Iraqi Shia Muslims
Islamic Supreme Council of Iraq politicians
Living people
Oil ministers of Iraq
Politicians from Baghdad
Vice presidents of Iraq
Iraqi expatriates in France
Finance ministers of Iraq
Prime Ministers of Iraq
People expelled from public office